Stuart James Garner (born November 1968) is a British businessman, convicted pension fraudster, and was the owner and CEO of the Norton Motorcycle Company from 2008 until it went into administration in 2020.

Early life
Garner was born in Derbyshire in November 1968. He left school without qualifications at the age of 16.

Career
He is a former gamekeeper, share trader and firework seller.

He acquired the Norton Motorcycle Company in 2008.

In 2013, he bought the 1790 Gothic Donington Hall and its 26-acre Donington estate from BMI Airlines, and it became the Norton head office, as well as his family home.

In June 2020, the Pension Ombudsman ruled that as a pension scheme trustee, Garner had "acted dishonestly and in breach of his duty". In December 2020, he was refused permission to appeal against the Pension Ombudsman's ruling that he must pay back £14 million missing from the Norton pension fund. Garner has also had a personal bankruptcy petition filed against him by Leicester City Council.

Personal life
In 2016, he bought the Priest House Hotel, adjacent to the Donington Hall estate, on the banks of the River Trent.

Garner married Susie Lodge in summer 2018, and has three children from a previous marriage.

References

Living people
1968 births
People from Derbyshire
British chief executives
British fraudsters